The Curious Creations of Christine McConnell is an American streaming television sitcom created by and starring Christine McConnell. It premiered on Netflix on October 12, 2018. The show consists of six episodes and was produced by Netflix, Wilshire Studios and Henson Alternative, an arm of The Jim Henson Company. The series was not renewed for a second season.

Premise
The show centers around Christine McConnell, an artist and baker who lives in a mansion full of monsters and ghosts. Accompanied by Rose, Rankle, and Edgar, McConnell loves to create morbid-looking desserts like gingerbread haunted houses, caramel spiders and bones made of pretzel sticks, peanut butter and white chocolate.

A combination of a DIY show and scripted reality, the show deals with annoying neighbors, relatives, and what to wear on a first date with someone you just met at the cemetery.

Characters
 Christine McConnell (portrayed by herself) – A baker and artist. She feeds and cares for the creatures that live with her. Christine is a kind and warm person; however, she lets the creatures plot against the neighbors and each other.
 Rose (performed by Colleen Smith) – A raccoon who was crushed to death in the back of a garbage truck but reanimated by Christine.
 Rankle (performed by Michael Oosterom) – The mummy of an ancient Egyptian cat. Christine found him in an antique store and read the spell on his burial plate to bring him back to life.
 Edgar (body-performed by Morgana Ignis, face-performed and voiced by Drew Massey) – A werewolf that was left on Christine's doorstep for her to find and now lives with her. 
 Bernard (performed by Tim Lagasse) – A monster that lives in the basement. Rose confides in him for advice and guidance.
 Milly – The creature that lives in the refrigerator. Only its tentacles are seen when assisting Christine by passing her items.
 Vivienne (portrayed by Dita Von Teese) – The ghost of a woman who has been shot by her supposed lover. She lives in the mirror and gives Christine advice on fashion. In the final episode, which takes place during Halloween, Vivienne takes corporeal form and goes out on a date with her lover. Viv is shown having various gunshot wounds to her back, while her date has a gunshot wound to the temple, implying their deaths are the result of a murder-suicide committed by the lover.
 Cousin Evie (portrayed by Colleen Smith) – Christine's insane cousin who is a widowed duchess. She discovers her parents' wills left everything to Christine and plots to kill her so that she can inherit.
 Norman (portrayed by Adam Mayfield) – Christine's lover who she meets at the graveyard while visiting her grandmother. He is a serial killer and comes to dinner regularly.
 Mr. Ketcham (portrayed by Steven Porter) – Christine's grumpy neighbor. He dislikes Christine and often complains about the creatures she lives with.

Production
Netflix had expressed interest in a goth-inspired series for a long time. McConnell, who already had a large following on Reddit and Instagram, pitched the show to Netflix and Brian Henson. Following the success of Julie's Greenroom, which had been released in early 2017, Netflix expressly wanted the Jim Henson company to produce the show. The company claimed that it was coordinating many other projects, however, Henson Alternative picked up the show.

Filming began in early 2017, and the series was released on October 12, 2018. McConnell was principally responsible for editing and post-production. She shot and edited many of the promotional posters herself, and recorded her own voiceovers for the baking segments of each episode.

Episodes

Reception
The show received critical praise for the mixture of retro styling and Gothic aesthetic, use of puppetry, and quirky charm of the series, while pointing out that lack of directions, unfamiliarity with some of the specialist materials used, and the elaborate construction of the creations would mean making them was beyond most home cooks.

The New Yorker commented that "As cooking lessons, McConnell's demos are almost entirely useless", but the show, "like her Instagram, is beautiful, morbid, bizarre, and raunchy [and] becomes a wonderfully fantastical take on the classic dump-and-stir cooking show".

Emma Stefansky of Thrillist also posted a positive review, calling it "a perfectly creepy cooking show". The Washington Post labelled her creations "elaborate dishes that are simultaneously delicious and disturbing". The Daily Dot described the series as "silly, sly, and utterly charming". USA Today listed it as one of their "top five best baking TV shows to binge-watch this weekend".

References

External links 
  on Netflix
 

2010s American sitcoms
2018 American television series debuts
2018 American television series endings
English-language Netflix original programming
American television shows featuring puppetry
Television series by The Jim Henson Company